Amy Schatz is an American director and producer of documentaries and children's shows and series. In March 2021, Schatz won the Directors Guild of America Award for Children's Programs for "We Are the Dream: The Kids of the Oakland MLK Oratorical Fest".

Early life and education 
Schatz is a graduate of McGill University in Montreal.

Career 
Schatz's work includes The Runaway Bunny, an animated musical based on the classic children's book, and  We Are the Dream: The Kids of the Oakland MLK Oratorical Fest. Schatz also created the Classical Baby series and  Goodnight Moon & Other Sleepytime Tales, Song of Parkland, an HBO Documentary featuring the Marjory Stoneman Douglas High School drama students, In the Shadow of the Towers: Stuvyesant High on 9/11 and the children’s documentary, What Happened on September 11. 

Additional HBO shows include The Number on Great-Grandpa's Arm, a short film for young people on The Holocaust, Saving My Tomorrow, a 6-part series on the environment produced with the American Museum of Natural History,  An Apology to Elephants, a film with Lily Tomlin, A Child's Garden of Poetry, A Family is a Family is a Family: a Rosie O’Donnell Celebration, Don't Divorce Me! Kids' Rules for Parents on Divorce, 'Twas the Night, and others. For PBS, her credits include the Bill Moyers series, Moyers on Addiction, A World of Ideas and What Can We Do About Violence? Schatz also worked on the feature films George Balanchine's The Nutcracker and Meredith Monk's Books of Days.

Her work has earned 8 Emmy Awards, 7 Directors Guild of America Awards, 3 Peabody Awards, Parents' Choice Award, the Gracie Award, 5 Animation Emmy Awards, and others. She is a member of the Directors Guild of America, Women in Film, and the Academy of Television Arts & Sciences.

Personal life 
Schatz lives in New York City with her husband, Max Rudin, and their two children.

References

External links

Year of birth missing (living people)
Living people
McGill University alumni
Place of birth missing (living people)
American documentary film directors
American documentary film producers
Television producers from New York City
American women television producers
American television directors
American women television directors
Directors Guild of America Award winners
Peabody Award winners
Primetime Emmy Award winners
HBO people
21st-century American women
American women documentary filmmakers